Montcabrier may refer to the following places in France:

 Montcabrier, Lot, a commune in the Lot department
 Montcabrier, Tarn, a commune in the Tarn department